The Mission Reds were a minor league baseball team located in San Francisco, California, that played in the Pacific Coast League (PCL) from 1926 through 1937.

First Missions team
In early September of 1914, the failed Sacramento Solons team moved to San Francisco and renamed itself "Mission", in reference to San Francisco's Mission District. San Francisco newspapers had dubbed the Sacramento team the "Wolves", in reference to manager Harry Wolverton. The "Wolves" nickname followed them to San Francisco.

The Mission club continued to play the Sacramento schedule for the final seven weeks of the 200-plus games season. They staged their home games at Ewing Field (the 1914 season's regular home of the San Francisco Seals); and at Oaks Park (regular home of the Oakland Oaks), often playing their Sunday doubleheaders one game on each side of the Bay. The Missions' last home games came on Sunday, October 25, with the morning game in San Francisco and the afternoon game in Oakland.

There was newspaper chatter about the Missions moving to Recreation Park for 1915, but by then they had moved to Salt Lake City, where they became the Salt Lake Bees.

Origins in Los Angeles
The Mission Reds were born in Los Angeles in 1909, where they played under the name the Vernon Tigers. The team won two Pacific Coast League pennants during its 18-year stay in Southern California. Declining attendance forced owner Edward Maier to put the team up for sale after the 1925 season. A group of San Francisco businessmen led by Herbert Fleishhacker purchased the Tigers, moved the team to San Francisco for the 1926 season, and called the team the Mission Reds.

History in San Francisco
San Francisco's second baseball team during this time period, the Mission Reds, were rivals to the well-established San Francisco Seals. Fans seldom referred to the team by its full name "Mission Reds," preferring instead "the Missions." More often than not, the PCL standings in newspapers listed the team as the "Missions" or "Mission." The terms "Reds" and "Missions" were used synonymously in game reports.

Like its short-lived predecessor, the Mission Reds were supposed to represent San Francisco's Mission District. From 1926 to 1930, the team played home games at Recreation Park, also home to the Seals. When the Seals moved to their own ballpark, Seals Stadium (at 16th and Potrero Streets), in 1931, the Missions followed suit.

The Mission Reds were unable to establish a fan base during their 12-year stay in San Francisco, nor was the team able to replace the Oakland Oaks as the Seals' main rival. To most San Francisco baseball fans, the Missions were the team to watch only when the Seals were on the road. 

The Missions finished first in the Pacific Coast League just once, in 1929; they lost the post-season series to the Hollywood Stars. The team had a 1,088-1,117 (.480) overall record. In 1935, Reds manager Gabby Street was suspended from the Pacific Coast League indefinitely for assaulting an umpire.

In 1938, two years after the Hollywood Stars moved to San Diego, owner Fleischaker, facing mounting losses on the field and at the gate, moved the Mission Reds back to Los Angeles. He renamed the team the Hollywood Stars.

References

Further reading

O'Neal, Bill. The Pacific Coast League 1903-1988. Eakin Press, Austin TX, 1990. .
Snelling, Dennis. The Pacific Coast League: A Statistical History, 1903-1957 McFarland & Company, Inc., Jefferson, NC, 1995. .

Professional baseball teams in California
 01
Baseball teams in San Francisco
Defunct baseball teams in California
Defunct Pacific Coast League teams
Mission District, San Francisco
Baseball teams established in 1926
Baseball teams disestablished in 1937
1926 establishments in California
1937 disestablishments in California